Kevin Peng Chun-heng is a Taiwanese politician.

Education
Peng earned bachelor's, master's, and doctoral degrees in public administration at National Chengchi University.

Career
Peng taught at Tamkang University. Peng then joined the Keelung City Government under mayor Lin Yu-chang as director general of the municipal Cultural Affairs Bureau until 2017, when he returned to the NCAF as chief executive officer, where he remained until 2019. After his appointment as deputy culture minister in 2019, Peng spoke at the 2019 Comic Exhibition in Taipei, the nomination ceremony for the radio portion of the 54th Golden Bell Awards, a ceremony honoring Taipei's Museum 207, which was one of the first private museums to be certified within the purview of the Museum Act, and the Taiwan-Germany Human Rights Education Workshop. As deputy culture minister, Peng commented on Fresh Taiwan, a showcase of Taiwanese brands and products overseas, and took part in commemorations of the Kaohsiung Incident in 2019, and the 228 incident in 2020.

References

Living people
21st-century Taiwanese politicians
National Chengchi University alumni
Government ministers of Taiwan
Year of birth missing (living people)